Yujiulü Shelun (Simplified Chinese: 郁久闾社仑; pinyin: Yùjiǔlǘ Shèlún, Wade–Giles: Yü-chiu-lü She-lun) (c. 391–410) or Qiudoufa Khagan (丘豆伐可汗) was khagan of the Rouran from 402 to 410.

Early years 
After his brother Heduohan (曷多汗) was defeated and killed by the Northern Wei general Zhangsun Fei (長孫肥), Shelun fled to west in 394, breaking ties with Wei. He found refuge among his uncle Yujiulü Pihouba (郁久闾匹候跋) and cousins. However, they were unhappy about his growing power, which forced Shelun to quickly gather his supporters and capture the sons of Pihouba. Soon, Shelun killed Pihouba as well, and his sons fled to Wei. Shelun was afraid of the revenge of the empire and migrated north through the Gobi, uniting nomadic tribes on his way.

Reign 
Shelun led retaliatory raids against Northern Wei, but suffered a serious defeat in 399 and was forced to flee westward. There he subjugated the Hulu (斛律) tribe and with an aid of a Hulu called Chiluohou (叱洛侯) he defeated the Gaoche, then declared himself Khagan. Shelun was the first major leader of the steppes to adopt the title of Qiudoufa Khagan (丘豆伐可汗) which was originally a title used by Xianbei nobles. He reorganized military-administrative system, modeling it after Xiongnu, divided the army into hundreds and thousands.

In order to strengthen his place, he became allied to Yao Xing, emperor of Later Qin. He aided Later Qin against Daowu in 403. In one occasion, his horse tributes to Qin were seized by Helian Bobo in 407. He continued to raid Northern Wei in 407 and 409. In one of those battles in 410, Emperor Mingyuan sent one of his advisors, Baba Song (拔拔嵩) the Duke of Nanping to attack the Rouran, and when Baba was surrounded by Shelun's troops, Emperor Mingyuan personally led an army to relieve Baba. Shelun died from his wounds in May 410 and was succeeded by his brother Yujiulü Hulü, because his sons Duba (度拔) and Sheba (社拔) were still young.

Personality and achievements
Shelun was described as "vicious/cruel, wily/artful, and possesses adaptability" in Book of Wei. He has been described as a "talented politician" and an autocratic leader by modern scholars, known for his cruelty, cunning and adaptability. He revolutionized the military and public organisation of Rouran (for example, introducing compulsory military recruitment and establishing strict rules of behavior for the warriors, and punishment for those who broke them), introduced the so-called decimal system, overwhelmed and united many Mongolian and Turkic tribes, broke all Rouran's vassalages, and was the first to take the title of khagan.

References

Bibliography

Sources 

 Book of Wei, vol. 103

 

410 deaths
Year of birth missing
Khagans of the Rouran
Founding monarchs